"Amazona" is the third track from Roxy Music's November 1973 album Stranded. It features a very high pitched guitar solo from Phil Manzanera. The intro features a Bo Diddley beat. The middle section is in 14/4 timing, 4 bars of 3/4 and one of 2/4.

Personnel
 Bryan Ferry: Voice and Piano
 Andy Mackay: Oboe and Saxophone (and Treatments)
 John Gustafson: Bass
 Paul Thompson: Drums and Timpani
 Phil Manzanera: Guitar (and Treatments)
 Eddie Jobson: Violin, Synthesizer and Keyboards

Roxy Music songs
1973 songs
Songs written by Bryan Ferry
Song recordings produced by Chris Thomas (record producer)
Songs written by Phil Manzanera